The Fleming Prize Lecture was started by the Microbiology Society in 1976 and named after Alexander Fleming, one of the founders of the society.  It is for early career researchers, generally within 12 of being awarded their PhD, who have an outstanding independent research record making a distinct contribution to microbiology. Nominations can be made by any member of the society.  Nominees do not have to be members. 

The award is £1,000 and the awardee is expected to give a lecture based on their research at the Microbiology Society's Annual Conference.

The following have been awarded this prize. 

1976 Graham Gooday Biosynthesis of the Fungal Wall – Mechanisms and Implications
1977 Peter Newell Cellular Communication During Aggregation of Dictyostelium
1978 George AM Cross Immunochemical Aspects of Antigenic Variation in Trypanosomes
1979 John Beringer The Development of Rhizobium Genetics
1980 Duncan James McGeoch Structural Analysis of Animal Virus Genomes
1981 Dave Sherratt The Maintenance and Propagation of Plasmid Genes in Bacterial Populations
1982 Brian Spratt Penicillin-binding Proteins and the Future of β-Lactam Antibiotics
1983 Ray Dixon The Genetic Complexity of Nitrogen Fixation Herpes Siplex and The Herpes Complex
1984 Paul Nurse Cell Cycle Control in Yeast
1985 Jeffrey Almond Genetic Diversity in Small RNA Viruses
1986 Douglas Kell Forces, Fluxes and Control of Microbial Metabolism
1987 Christopher Higgins Molecular Mechanisms of Membrane Transport: from Microbes to Man
1988 Gordon Dougan An Oral Route to Rational Vaccination
1989 Andrew Davison Varicella-Zoster Virus
1989 Graham J Boulnois Molecular Dissection of the Host-Microbe Interaction in Infection
1990 No award
1991 Lynne Boddy The Ecology of Wood- and Litter-rotting Basidiomycete Fungi
1992 Geoffrey L Smith Vaccinia Virus Glycoproteins and Immune Evasion
1993 Neil Gow Directional Growth and Guidance Systems of Fungal Pathogens
1994 Ian Roberts Bacterial Polysaccharides in Sickness and in Health and Charles Dorman DNA Topology and the Global Regulation of Bacterial Virulence Gene Expression
1995 No award
1996 Anthony Carr Cell Division and Mitosis in the Fission Yeast Schizosaccharomyces pombe
1997 Colin J Stirling Protein Targeting to the Endoplasmic Reticulum in Yeast
1998 No award
1999 David Richardson Bacterial Respiration: a Flexible Process for a Changing Environment
2000 Peter Simmons The Origin and Evolution of Hepatitis Viruses in Humans
2001 Brendan Kenny Enteropathogenic Escherichia coli
2002 Tracy Palmer and Ben Berks Moving Folded Proteins Across the Bacterial Cell Membrane
2003 Chris Bishoff  AIDS-associated Cancer and KSHV/HHV-8
2004 Mark Paget Managing Redox Stress in Bacteria
2005 Adrian Whitehouse Understanding the Latent-Lytic Switch in Gamma-2 Herpesviruses
2006 Frank Sargent Constructing the Wonders of the Bacterial World: Biosynthesis of Complex Enzymes
2007 Greg Challis Mining Microbial Genomes for New Natural Products and Biosynthetic Pathways
2008 Cameron Simmons  Understanding Emerging Pathogens: H5N1 Influenza and Dengue in Vietnam
2009 Nicola Stanley-Wall  The Complexity of Biofilm Formation by Bacillus subtilis
2010 Steve Diggle Microbial Communication and Virulence: Lessons from Evolutionary Theory
2011 Peter Cherepanov Structural Biology of Retroviral DNA Integration
2012 William Hanage Plagues and Populations - Patterns of Pathogen Evolution
2013 No award 
2014 Nikolay Zenkin Multiple personalities of RNA polymerase active centre
2015 Michael Brockhurst Rapid microbial evolution: From the lab to the clinic and back again
2016 David Grainger The unexpected complexity of bacterial genomes
2017 Stephen Baker The collateral damage of antimicrobial access in Asia
2018 Sarah Coulthurst type VI secretion system-mediated bacterial warfare
2019 Peter Fineran bacterial innate and adaptive immune systems
2020 Edze Westra  molecular mechanisms and evolutionary ecology of CRISPR-Cas systems.
2021 Britt Koskella bacteria and viruses of the plant microbiome
2023 Tanmay Bharat research on prokaryotic surface layers and biofilms

References

Biology awards
British science and technology awards
Awards established in 1976